Stony View is an unincorporated area in the rural municipality of Insinger No. 275, in the Canadian province of Saskatchewan. Stony View is located 10 km north of Highway 746 & south of Highway 5 on Township road 310 in eastern Saskatchewan.

See also

List of communities in Saskatchewan
List of rural municipalities in Saskatchewan

Ghost towns in Saskatchewan
Insinger No. 275, Saskatchewan
Unincorporated communities in Saskatchewan
Division No. 9, Saskatchewan